Stroinolepis is an extinct genus of thelodontid that lived during the Middle Ordovician period in what is now the Severnaya Zemlya archipelago of Russia.

References

Thelodonti genera
Ordovician jawless fish
Fossils of Russia